Seo Ju-hyun (born June 28, 1991), known professionally as Seohyun, is a South Korean singer, actress and songwriter. She debuted as a member of girl group Girls' Generation (and later its subgroup Girls' Generation-TTS) in August 2007, which went on to become one of the best-selling artists in South Korea and one of South Korea's most popular girl groups worldwide. Seohyun released her first extended play Don't Say No in 2017. She left SM Entertainment later that year, although she remains as a member of Girls' Generation. She joined Namoo Actors in 2019.

Aside from her music career, she has established herself as an actress. Following her supporting role in the television drama Passionate Love (2013) and Moon Lovers: Scarlet Heart Ryeo (2016), she starred in Bad Thief, Good Thief (2017), Time (2018), Private Lives (2020) and Jinxed at First (2022). Her film work includes Love and Leashes (2022). She also participated in the original and Korean versions of stage musicals including Moon Embracing the Sun, Gone with the Wind and Mamma Mia.

Early life and education
Seohyun was born Seo Ju-hyun on June 28, 1991, in Seoul, South Korea, and is the only child in her family. Her mother was a chairwoman at a piano school and Seohyun was taught how to play piano, as well as violin and traditional Korean drums in her early childhood. She also learned horseback riding and skating as a child. Her parents did not encourage her to become a celebrity, but Seohyun credited them as the ones who helped her choose her career path by letting her experience different things. As a fifth grader, Seohyun was discovered by a talent scout while riding in a subway train. She sang children's songs for her audition at SM Entertainment, and was accepted as a trainee. Seohyun cited BoA, S.E.S and Fin.K.L. as her main influences to become a singer, expressing "I thought it was cool to show and communicate the emotions through songs".

Seohyun graduated from Jeonju Arts High School in February 2010.

She attended Dongguk University, majoring in theatre acting and graduated in August 2014, receiving an achievement award at the graduation ceremony. Her fellow Girls' Generation member, Yoona, attended the same university.

Career

2007–2011: Career beginnings
In August 2007, Seohyun made her official debut as the youngest member of girl group Girls' Generation. The group gained significant popularity after the release of their hit single "Gee" in 2009.

Seohyun's early solo work mostly involved songs recorded for side projects and original soundtracks. Although they did not achieve much commercial success; her duet titled "JjaLaJaJJa" with veteran singer Joo Hyun-mi earned a "Trot Music of the Year" nomination at the 2009 Mnet Asian Music Awards. In 2010–2011, Seohyun appeared in MBC's variety show We Got Married 2, alongside CNBLUE's Yonghwa. They played a make-believe couple, portraying what life would be like if they were married. In addition, Seohyun was cast as voice actor for the Korean-dubbed version of animated film Despicable Me (2010) and its sequel Despicable Me 2 (2013), together with fellow member Taeyeon. She voiced the character of Edith, who is known for her rebellious attitude.

2012–2016: TTS and musical acting
In April 2012, Seohyun, along with fellow members Taeyeon and Tiffany, formed a Girls' Generation subgroup named TTS. Their debut EP, Twinkle, met with much success and became the eighth highest selling album of the year in South Korea. The subgroup went on to release two more EPs: Holler (2014) and Dear Santa (2015). Besides contributing her vocals to Girls' Generation and TTS songs, Seohyun began to become more active in lyrics writing. She co-wrote the songs "Baby Maybe" and "XYZ" (I Got a Boy, 2013) and was credited as the sole lyricist for "Only U" (Holler, 2014) and "Dear Santa" (Dear Santa, 2015).

In 2013, Seohyun debuted as an actress when she was cast for a supporting role in SBS's drama Passionate Love. She played Han Yu-rim, a veterinary student and first love of the male lead character. Director Bae Tae-sub said Seohyun's persona "perfectly paralleled that of her role" and "her understanding and expressiveness of the character exceeds those of a rookie actress".

Seohyun, self-described as someone who likes both singing and acting, began to develop an interest in musical theatre. She named musical actress Ock Joo-hyun, who later became her mentor, as her main influence. Although she had wanted to be in a musical for a long time, she rejected casting offers because she felt unprepared. In January 2014, her wish was fulfilled as she accepted her first musical acting role. Seohyun made her theatrical debut in the musical, Moon Embracing the Sun, which was adapted from the novel of the same name. Seohyun played the lead role, Yeon-woo, the daughter of a noble family who has a love relationship with both the King and his brother.

In January 2015, Seohyun was cast in the role of Scarlett O'Hara in the Korean version of Autant en emporte le vent, a French musical based on Gone with the Wind. She received encouraging review for her performance. Seon Mi-gyeong of OSEN said that while Seohyun's performance cannot surpass that of Bada, who shared the same role, her "fierce voice" complemented and successfully expressed an arrogant Scarlett O'Hara. Kim Hyun-joong of Sports Chosun noted Seohyun's occasional "clumsy" acting, but compared her to Ock Joo-hyun during her rookie days and said that "her ability to bring emotion through song, the most important part of a musical, rivaled that of a veteran actor. Despite a short career, she endlessly showed us various colours and peculiar charms of a woman's life."

From February–June 2016, Seohyun was cast in the Korean version of the musical Mamma Mia. She played a character named Sophie, a 20-year-old bride-to-be, who hopes to find out who her biological father is on her wedding day. Kim Geum-yeong from CNB Journal commented on Seohyun's improvement from her prior musical performances, praising her "natural acting" and "daring side" while Park Jeong-hwan from News1 claimed Seohyun's performance made the musical "all the more entertaining". Seohyun next played supporting roles in Chinese romantic film So I Married An Anti-fan and SBS's historical drama Moon Lovers: Scarlet Heart Ryeo; the latter earned her a Special Acting Award at the 2016 SBS Drama Awards.

2017–2018: Solo debut and departure from SM Entertainment

In January 2017, Seohyun became the third Girls' Generation member to release a solo album, with the release of her debut extended play titled Don't Say No. For this record, Seohyun took full initiatives and control of the production process, shaping her own musical style–a fulfillment of what she was unable to do fully being in a larger musical group. Tamar Herman from Billboard noted the album presented a "new maturity" to the singer. Don't Say No debuted atop the South Korean Gaon Album Chart. To accompany her solo release, she held a concert residency titled "Love, Still – Seohyun", part of a series of concerts by SM Entertainment artists.

After taking part in OnStyle's web-drama Ruby Ruby Love, Seohyun next starred in MBC's weekend drama Bad Thief, Good Thief as Kang So-joo, a police-woman-turned-investigator who struggles to fight against the abusive officials. Her portrayal of the character earned her the Best New Actress award at the 2017 MBC Drama Awards.

In October 2017, Seohyun left SM Entertainment after her contract ended. Her future activities with Girls' Generation remain in discussion.

In 2018, Seohyun was cast as the female lead in MBC's melodrama The Time as the character Seol Ji-hyun, a bright and optimistic woman who became depressed after the tragic death of her sibling.

2019–present: New agency and continued acting career
In March 2019, Seohyun signed with Namoo Actors. A year after signing with her new agency, she starred in the short drama Hello Dracula. She played the role of An-na, an elementary school teacher who hid her emotions from her mother since the day she came out to her as a lesbian. Later that year, she starred in the JTBC television series Private Lives as Cha Joo-eun, a swindler who has to choose a deceptive path to survive in Korea.

In February 2022, Seohyun made her debut in a movie as a lead actress in the Netflix original movie Love and Leashes, based on the webtoon Moral Sense. She played the character of Jung Jiwoo, a competent public relations team member who accidentally found out her co-worker's BDSM desires. Her portrayal of the role earned her a nomination for the Best New Actress award under the Film category at the 58th Baeksang Arts Awards. In April 2022, Seohyun renewed her contract with Namoo Actors. 

In June 2022, Seohyun starred in the KBS fantasy romance series Jinxed at First, She played the character Lee Seul-bi, who has the special ability of seeing the future of any person she touches. The role earned her the Best New Actress award at the 2022 KBS Drama Awards, as well as the Best Couple Award with the male lead co-actor Na In-woo.

Seohyun has been announced to star in the upcoming films Holy Night: Demon Hunters and Seeking the King. She will also star in the Netflix original series, Song of the Bandits.

Other ventures

Philanthropy
In 2011, Seohyun named former United Nations Secretary-General Ban Ki-moon as her life mentor and role model, stating that his book, at one point in time, had helped her endure hard times. She was appointed as the United Nations Pavilion's ambassador at Yeosu Expo, where she was presented with the honor by Ban.

In 2013, as an effort to help less-fortunate students with their studies, she donated 100 million Korean won to Dongguk University.

In 2020, Seohyun donated 100 million Korean won worth of feminine products to NGO Official Development Association Korea.

In April 2022, Seohyun donated 17,000 sanitary pads for women's products. The donated feminine products were distributed to a total of 31 organizations, including four of the Nanum Employment Welfare Foundation, the Multicultural Family Support Center for Healthy Families in Uijeongbu and member organizations of the Uijeongbu Regional Children's Center Association and delivered to 500 students from multicultural and low-income families.

Endorsements
From 2011 to 2013, Seohyun was the official international ambassador for cosmetics brand The Face Shop.

From 2016 to 2018, Seohyun was selected as South Korean ambassador for hair care brand Pantene along with fellow member Yuri.

In 2021, Seohyun was selected as the Asia-Pacific ambassador for mid-range beauty brand Clinique.

In 2022, Seohyun was selected as the muse for ACWELL, a Korean natural dermatology cosmetic brand.

Discography

Extended plays
 Don't Say No (2017)

Filmography

Film

Television series

Web series

Television shows

Hosting

Theater

Awards and nominations

State honors

References

External links

 
 

1991 births
Living people
Actresses from Seoul
Dongguk University alumni
Girls' Generation members
Singers from Seoul
South Korean women pop singers
South Korean female idols
South Korean television presenters
South Korean women television presenters
South Korean voice actresses
Japanese-language singers of South Korea
Mandarin-language singers of South Korea
SM Entertainment artists
South Korean musical theatre actresses
South Korean film actresses
South Korean television actresses
South Korean child singers
South Korean web series actresses
21st-century South Korean women singers